Iran Air Flight 655 was a scheduled passenger flight from Tehran to Dubai via Bandar Abbas that was shot down on 3July 1988 by two SM-2MR surface-to-air missiles fired by the , a guided-missile cruiser of the United States Navy. The missiles hit the aircraft, an Airbus A300, while it was flying its usual route over Iran's territorial waters in the Persian Gulf, shortly after the flight departed its stopover location, Bandar Abbas International Airport.  All 290 people on board were killed. The attack occurred during the Iran–Iraq War, which had been continuing for nearly eight years. Vincennes had entered Iranian territorial waters after one of its helicopters drew warning fire from Iranian speedboats operating within Iranian territorial limits.

The reason for the downing has been disputed between the governments of the two countries. According to the United States, the Vincennes crew had incorrectly identified the Airbus as an attacking F-14 Tomcat, a U.S.-made jet fighter that had been part of the Iranian Air Force inventory since the 1970s. While the F-14s had been supplied to Iran in an air-to-air configuration, the Vincennes crew had been briefed that the Iranian F-14s were equipped with air-to-ground ordnance. The U.S. military asserts that the Vincennes had made ten attempts to contact the aircraft both on military and civilian frequencies but received no response. According to Iran, the cruiser negligently shot down the aircraft, which was transmitting IFF squawks in Mode III, a signal that identified it as a civilian aircraft, and not Mode II as used by Iranian military aircraft. The event generated a great deal of criticism of the United States. Some analysts blamed the captain of Vincennes, William C. Rogers III, for overly aggressive behavior in a tense and dangerous environment. In the days immediately following the incident, President Ronald Reagan issued a written diplomatic note to the Iranian government, expressing deep regret. When Reagan was directly asked if he considered the statement an apology, he replied, "Yes." However, the U.S. continued to insist that Vincennes was acting in "self-defense".

In 1996, during the Clinton Administration, the governments of the U.S. and Iran reached a settlement at the International Court of Justice, which included the statement "...the United States recognized the aerial incident of 3July 1988 as a terrible human tragedy and expressed deep regret over the loss of lives caused by the incident..." As part of the settlement, even though the U.S. government did not admit legal liability or formally apologize to Iran, it agreed to pay US$61.8 million on an ex gratia basis in compensation to the families of the Iranian victims. The shootdown was the deadliest aviation disaster involving an Airbus A300 as well as the deadliest aviation disaster in 1988. It was also the deadliest airliner shootdown incident until 2014 when Malaysia Airlines Flight 17 was shot down over Ukraine.

Background

In 1984, the war between Iraq and Iran had expanded to include air attacks against oil tankers and merchant shipping of neighboring countries, some of whom were providing aid to Iraq by shipping Iraqi oil. The Flight 655 incident occurred a year after the USS Stark incident, during which the Iraqi Air Force attacked the U.S. Navy guided missile frigate  on 17 May 1987, killing 37 American sailors. U.S. naval forces had also exchanged gunfire with Iranian gunboats in late 1987, and the guided missile frigate  had struck an Iranian sea mine in April 1988. Two months before the incident, the U.S. had engaged in Operation Praying Mantis, resulting in the sinkings of the Iranian frigate Sahand, the Iranian fast attack craft Joshan, and three Iranian speedboats. Also, the Iranian frigate Sabalan was crippled, two Iranian platforms were destroyed, and an Iranian fighter was damaged. A total of at least 56 Iranian crew were killed, while the U.S. suffered the loss of only one helicopter, which crashed apparently by accident, and its two pilots were killed. Tensions were high in the Strait of Hormuz at the time of the incident with Flight 655.

In response to the pattern of attacks on shipping, the U.S. Joint Chiefs of Staff issued a NOTAM on 8September 1987, warning all Persian Gulf countries that civilian aircraft must monitor the 121.5 MHz VHF International Air Distress or the 243.0 MHz UHF Military Air Distress frequencies and be prepared to identify themselves to U.S. Navy ships and state their intentions.

On 29 April 1988, the U.S. expanded the scope of its navy's protection to all friendly neutral shipping in the Persian Gulf outside declared exclusion zones, which set the stage for the shootdown. At about the same time, Vincennes was rushed to the area on a short-notice deployment, as a result of high-level decisions, to compensate for the lack of AWACS coverage, which was hampering U.S. monitoring of the southern Persian Gulf. Vincennes was fitted with the then-new Aegis Combat System and under the command of Captain William C. Rogers III at the time of the shootdown. 

It is normal for ships, including warships, entering or leaving the Persian Gulf to transit Iranian territorial waters. During the Iran–Iraq War the Iranian forces frequently boarded and inspected neutral cargo ships in the Strait of Hormuz in search of contraband destined for Iraq. While legal under international law, these inspections added to the tensions in the area.

Shootdown of Flight 655

The plane, an Airbus A300 (registered as ), was under the control of 37-year-old Captain Mohsen Rezaian (a veteran pilot with 7,000 hours of flight time), 31-year-old First Officer Kamran Teymouri, and 33-year-old Flight Engineer Mohammad Reza Amini. It left Bandar Abbas at 10:17 Iran time (UTC+03:30), 27 minutes after its scheduled departure time. It should have been a 28-minute flight. After takeoff, it was directed by the Bandar Abbas tower to turn on its transponder and proceed over the Persian Gulf. The flight was assigned routinely to commercial air corridor Amber 59, a -wide lane on a direct line to Dubai airport. The airliner was transmitting the correct transponder "squawk" code typical of a civilian aircraft and maintained radio contact in English with appropriate air traffic control facilities.

On the morning of 3 July 1988, USS Vincennes was passing through the Strait of Hormuz returning from an escort duty. A helicopter deployed from the cruiser reportedly received small arms fire from Iranian patrol vessels as it observed from high altitude. Vincennes moved to engage the Iranian vessels, in the course of which they all violated Omani waters and left after being challenged and ordered to leave by a Royal Navy of Oman warship. Vincennes then pursued the Iranian gunboats, entering Iranian territorial waters. Admiral Crowe said the cruiser's helicopter was over international waters when the gunboats first fired upon it.

Flight 655 was first detected by Vincennes immediately after takeoff when it received a short IFF Mode II, possibly leading the crew of Vincennes to believe the airliner was an Iranian F-14 Tomcat (capable of carrying unguided bombs since 1985) diving into an attack profile. Contrary to the accounts of various Vincennes crew members, the cruiser's Aegis Combat System recorded that the airliner was climbing at the time and its radio transmitter was squawking on only the Mode III civilian frequency, and not on the military Mode II.

Since the USS Stark incident, all aircraft in the area had to monitor 121.5 MHz, the International Air Distress (IAD) radio frequency. A total of 10 attempts were made to warn the airliner, seven on the Military Air Distress (MAD) frequency, and three on the IAD frequency. There were no responses.

With the aircraft not answering radio challenges and continuing towards Vincennes, the ship's crew commenced the process to engage it. The naval officer responsible for authorizing a missile launch, the watch's Anti-Air Warfare Coordinator (AAWC), pushed wrong buttons no fewer than five times in response to a system message to select a weapon. In the meantime, the officer in charge of firing missiles, the watch's Missile System Supervisor (MSS), pushed "REQUEST RADIATION ASSIGN" no fewer than 22 times, all without effect due to the AAWC not completing the appropriate process at his console. The AAWC finally selected the correct input at his console, allowing the MSS to again push "REQUEST RADIATION ASSIGN" and continue the procedure.

The plane disintegrated immediately and soon crashed into the water. None of the 290 passengers and crew on board survived. The cockpit voice recorder and flight data recorder were never found.

The location of Vincennes in Iranian territorial waters at the time of the incident was admitted by the U.S. government in legal briefs and publicly by Chairman of the Joint Chiefs of Staff, Admiral William J. Crowe, on Nightline.

Nationalities of the victims

According to the documents Iran submitted to the International Court of Justice, the aircraft was carrying 290 people: 274 passengers and a crew of 16. Of these 290, 254 were Iranian, 13 were Emiratis, 10 were Indians, six were Pakistanis, six were Yugoslavs and one was an Italian.

U.S. government accounts

Pentagon officials initially said Vincennes had shot down an Iranian F-14, but issued a retraction within hours and confirmed Iranian reports that the target was instead a civilian Airbus. According to the U.S. government, Vincennes mistakenly identified the airliner as an attacking military fighter and misidentified its flight profile as being similar to that of an F-14A Tomcat during an attack run; however, the cruiser's Aegis Combat System recorded the plane's flight plan as climbing (not descending as in an attack run) at the time of the incident. The flight had originated at Bandar Abbas which served both as a base for Iranian F-14 operations and as a hub for commercial flights. According to the same reports, Vincennes unsuccessfully tried to contact the approaching aircraft, seven times on the military emergency frequency and three times on the civilian emergency frequency. The civilian aircraft was not equipped to receive military frequencies and the messages on the civilian emergency channel could have been directed at any aircraft. More confusion arose as the hailed speed was the ground speed, while the pilot's instruments displayed airspeed, a  difference.

This was admitted in a report by Admiral William Fogarty, entitled Formal Investigation into the Circumstances Surrounding the Downing of Iran Air Flight 655 on 3July 1988 (the "Fogarty report"). The Fogarty report stated, "The data from USS Vincennes tapes, information from USS Sides and reliable intelligence information, corroborate the fact that [Iran Air Flight 655] was on a normal commercial air flight plan profile, in the assigned airway, squawking Mode III 6760, on a continuous ascent in altitude from takeoff at Bandar Abbas to shoot-down."

The Fogarty report also stated, "Iran must share the responsibility for the tragedy by hazarding one of their civilian airliners by allowing it to fly a relatively low altitude air route in close proximity to hostilities that had been ongoing."

When questioned in a 2000 BBC documentary, the U.S. government stated in a written answer that they believed the incident may have been caused by a simultaneous psychological condition amongst the eighteen bridge crew of Vincennes, called "scenario fulfillment", which is said to occur when persons are under pressure. In such a situation, the men will carry out a training scenario, believing it to be reality while ignoring sensory information that contradicts the scenario. In the case of this incident, the scenario was an attack by a lone military aircraft.

Iranian government account

According to the Iranian government, the shootdown was an intentionally performed and unlawful act. Even if there was a mistaken identification, which Iran never accepted, it argues that this constituted negligence and recklessness amounting to an international crime, not an accident.

In particular, Iran expressed skepticism about claims of misidentification, noting that the cruiser's advanced Aegis radar correctly tracked the flight and its Mode III beacon; two other U.S. warships in the area, Sides and Montgomery, also identified the aircraft as civilian; and the flight was well within a recognized international air corridor. It also noted that the crew of Vincennes were trained to handle simultaneous attacks by hundreds of enemy aircraft. Iran found it more plausible that Vincennes "hankered for an opportunity to show its stuff".

Flight 655 had been cleared from a regional airport and was well outside those limits when it was attacked. Even if the plane had truly been an Iranian F-14, Iran argued that the U.S. would not have had the right to shoot it down, as it was flying within Iranian airspace and did not follow a path that could be considered an attack profile, nor did it illuminate Vincennes with radar. Prior to the incident, Vincennes had entered Iranian territorial waters and was inside these waters when it launched its missiles. Even had the crew of Flight 655 made mistakes, the U.S. government would remain responsible for the actions of Vincennes' crew, under international law.

Iran pointed out that in the past "the United States has steadfastly condemned the shooting down of aircraft, whether civil or military, by the armed forces of another State" and cited El Al Flight 402, Libyan Arab Airlines Flight 114, and Korean Air Lines Flight 007, among other incidents. Iran also noted that when Iraq attacked the USS Stark, the U.S. found Iraq fully responsible on the grounds that the Iraqi pilot "knew or should have known" he was attacking a U.S. warship.

Independent sources

In 1989, prior to the public exposure of Vincennes' position inside Iranian waters on Nightline by Admiral William Crowe, Professor Andreas Lowenfeld of the Editing Board of the American Journal of International Law criticized the official U.S. position (that the U.S. was not legally liable for the incident):

Lowenfeld also pointed out that the amount of compensation paid for Iranian victims was one-tenth the amount demanded from Iraq for American dead aboard the USS Stark.

One legal scholar noted in the Yale Journal of International Law, "The downing of Flight 655 should not be deemed lawful merely because the Vincennes' commanding officer reasonably mistook the situation as presenting an integrated surface and air attack. Reconceptualizing the incident as a mistake problem does not excuse the Vincennes from liability."

In an article published in Newsweek magazine on 13 July 1992, John Barry and Roger Charles argued that Rogers behaved recklessly and without due care. The Newsweek article also accused the U.S. government of a cover-up, but on July 21 Admiral Crowe denied any knowledge. An analysis of the events by the International Strategic Studies Association described the deployment of an Aegis cruiser in the zone as irresponsible and felt that the value placed on Aegis cruisers by the U.S. Navy had played a major part in the setting of a low threshold for opening fire. Vincennes had been nicknamed "RoboCruiser" by crew members and other U.S. Navy ships, in reference to both its Aegis system and the supposed aggressive tendencies of its captain.

The International Court of Justice case relating to the attack, "the Aerial Incident of July 3, 1988" (Islamic Republic of Iran v. United States of America), was dropped on 22 February 1996 following settlement and reparations by the United States.

Three years after the incident, Admiral Crowe admitted on American television show Nightline that Vincennes was inside Iranian territorial waters when it launched the missiles. This contradicted earlier navy statements. The International Civil Aviation Organization (ICAO) report of December 1988 placed Vincennes well inside Iran's territorial waters.

Commander David Carlson, commanding officer of USS Sides, the warship stationed nearest to Vincennes at the time of the incident, is reported to have said that the destruction of the aircraft "marked the horrifying climax to Captain Rogers's aggressiveness, first seen four weeks ago". His comment referred to incidents on 2June, when Rogers had sailed Vincennes too close to an Iranian frigate undertaking a lawful search of a bulk carrier, launched a helicopter within  of a small Iranian craft despite rules of engagement requiring a four-mile (6.4 km) separation, and opened fire on small Iranian military boats. Of those incidents, Carlson commented, "Why do you want an Aegis cruiser out there shooting up boats? It wasn't a smart thing to do." He also said that Iranian forces he had encountered in the area a month prior to the incident were "pointedly non-threatening" and professional. At the time of Rogers's announcement to higher command that he was going to shoot down the plane, Carlson is reported to have been thunderstruck: "I said to folks around me, 'Why, what the hell is he doing?' I went through the drill again. F-14. He's climbing. By now this damn thing is at 7,000 feet." Carlson thought Vincennes might have more information and was unaware that Rogers had been wrongly informed that the plane was diving. Carlson is also reported to have written in the U.S. Naval Proceedings that he had "wondered aloud in disbelief" on hearing of Vincennes' intentions. In speculating on the "climate" that led up to the incident, Carlson said Vincennes, shortly beforehand dubbed by officers aboard Sides as "RoboCruiser" for its aggressiveness, engaged in a pattern of aggressive behavior over the prior month because the crew of Vincennes "felt a need to prove the viability of Aegis in the Persian Gulf, and that they hankered for the opportunity to show their stuff."

Radio communication

Both Sides and Vincennes tried contacting Flight 655 on several civilian and military frequencies. International investigations concluded that Flight 655's crew assumed the three calls they received before the missiles struck must have been directed at an Iranian P-3 Orion (see below). The International Civil Aviation Organization said the flight crew should have been monitoring the civilian frequency. They also said "American warships in the gulf had no equipment that allowed them to monitor civilian air traffic control radio frequencies, and thus no means of hearing the many radio transmissions between Iran Air Flight 655 and air traffic controllers that would have identified the aircraft to the Vincennes' crew."

Potential factors

 The Aegis System software at that time reused tracking numbers in its display, constituting a user interface design flaw. The Aegis software initially assigned the on-screen identifier TN4474 to Flight 655. Before Vincennes fired, the Aegis software switched the Flight 655 tracking number to TN4131 and recycled Flight 655's old tracking number of TN4474 to label a fighter jet 110 miles away. When the captain asked for a status on TN4474, he was told it was a fighter and descending. Scientific American rated it as one of the worst user interface disasters.
 A psychological evaluation of the crew, requested by Admiral Fogarty, concluded that stress and inexperience of the crew in warfare resulted in misjudgment and unconscious distortion of data, which played a significant role in the misinterpretation of the data of the Aegis System. 
 Although the information about Flight 655 shows the plane is ascending and not descending, the crew relied on people they could trust instead of the computer systems.
 As Flight 655 takes off, an Iranian Air Force F-14 is also on the tarmac at Bandar Abbas. When Anderson hooks Flight 655 when it takes off, he leaves it hooked for almost 90 seconds. Though the hook moves towards the Vincennes, the system is still reading IFF signals from Bandar Abbas.
 The ship's commanding officer believes Iran 655 is an F-14 that is involved in a coordinated surface and air strike.
 The Vincennes transmits three radio warnings on the civil distress frequency, but they fail to identify who exactly they are addressing. Its radio crew cite the aircraft's ground speed while Flight 655 is operating on airspeed. The plane's airspeed could have been 50 knots slower than the speed mentioned by the Vincennes.
 During its flight, Flight 655 transmits a unique code that tells radars what flight it is. Had the Vincennes used this specific code when addressing the flight crew, the pilots could have immediately realised they were in a danger zone. However, the U.S. Navy does not train radio personnel to use this particular code when talking to civilian aircraft.
 The radar, for all its sophistication, cannot detect the type or size of the aircraft. 
 Despite its complex technology, the ship does not have a radio tuned to specific civil air frequencies.
 IFF on the ship marks Iran Air 655 as Mode 3, a generic frequency that is insufficient to identify a plane as friend or foe.
 The ship's crew did not efficiently consult commercial airliner schedules due to confusion over which time zone the schedules referred to—the scheduled flight times used Bandar Abbas airport time while Vincennes was on Bahrain time. The airliner's departure was 27 minutes later than scheduled. "The Combat Information Center (CIC) was also very dark, and the few lights that it did have flickered every time Vincennes fired at the speedboats. This was of special concern to Petty Officer Andrew Anderson, who first picked up Flight 655 on radar and thought it might be a commercial aircraft. As he was searching in the navy's listing of commercial flights, he apparently missed Flight 655 because it was so dark."
 An Iranian P-3 was in the area some time before the attack,  and some reports explained why no radar signals were detected from Iran Air Flight 655.
 The psychology and mindset after engaging in a battle with Iranian gunboats. There are claims that Vincennes was engaged in an operation using a decoy cargo ship to lure Iranian gunboats to a fight. These claims were denied by Fogarty in Hearing Before The Investigation Subcommittee and The Defense Policy Panel of The Committee on Armed Services, House of Representatives, One Hundred Second Congress, Second Session, 21 July 1992. Also, the initial claims of Vincennes being called for help by a cargo ship attacked by Iranian gunboats have been ruled out. That leads to claims that the Iranian gunboats were provoked by helicopters inside Iranian waters, not the other way around.

Critique of U.S. media coverage

In 1991, political scientist Robert Entman of George Washington University compared U.S. media coverage of the incident with the similar shootdown of Korean Air Lines Flight 007 by the Soviet Union five years earlier by studying material from Time, Newsweek, The New York Times, The Washington Post and CBS Evening News. According to Entman, framing techniques were used to frame the Korean Airlines incident as sabotage while framing the Iran Air incident as a tragic mistake, stating "the angle taken by the U.S. media emphasized the moral bankruptcy and guilt of the perpetrating nation. With Iran Air 655, the frame de-emphasised guilt and focused on the complex problems of operating military high technology." By "de-emphasizing the agency and the victims and by the choice of graphics and adjectives, the news stories about the U.S. downing of an Iranian plane called it a technical problem while the Soviet downing of a Korean jet was portrayed as a moral outrage." Entman included polling that appeared to show that the unbalanced coverage swayed public opinion against the Soviet Union and Iran. In July 2014, when Malaysia Airlines Flight 17 was shot down in Ukraine, some commentators noted the discrepancy between the U.S. official position and media coverage of the two similar incidents.

Aftermath

The event sparked an intense international controversy, with Iran condemning the attack. In mid-July 1988, Iranian Foreign Minister Ali Akbar Velayati asked the United Nations Security Council to condemn the United States saying the attack "could not have been a mistake" and was a "criminal act", a "massacre", and an "atrocity". George H. W. Bush, then-vice president of the United States in the Reagan administration, defended his country at the UN by arguing that the U.S. attack had been a wartime incident and the crew of Vincennes had acted appropriately to the situation. The Soviet Union asked the U.S. to withdraw from the area and supported efforts by the Security Council to end the Iran–Iraq War. Most of the remainder of the 13 delegates who spoke supported the U.S. position, saying one of the problems was that a 1987 resolution to end the Iran–Iraq war had been ignored. Following the debate, Security Council Resolution 616 was passed expressing "deep distress" over the U.S. attack and "profound regret" for the loss of human lives, and stressing the need to end the Iran–Iraq War as resolved in 1987.

Inside Iran, this shootdown was perceived as a purposeful attack by the United States, signalling that the U.S. was about to enter into a direct war against Iran on the side of Iraq. 

In February 1996, the U.S. agreed to pay Iran US$131.8 million in settlement to discontinue a case brought by Iran in 1989 against the U.S. in the International Court of Justice relating to this incident, together with other earlier claims before the Iran–United States Claims Tribunal. US$61.8 million of the claim was in compensation for the 248 Iranians killed in the shootdown: $300,000 per wage-earning victim and $150,000 per non-wage-earner. 

The U.S. government issued notes of regret for the loss of human lives, but never formally apologized or acknowledged wrongdoing. On 5July 1988 President Ronald Reagan expressed regret; when directly asked if he considered the statement an apology, Reagan replied, "Yes." George H. W. Bush, the vice president of the United States at the time commented on a separate occasion, speaking to a group of Republican ethnic leaders (7 August 1988): "I will never apologize for the United States—I don't care what the facts are... I'm not an apologize-for-America kind of guy." The quote, although unrelated to the downing of the Iranian airliner and not in any official capacity, has been mistakenly attributed as such. Bush used the phrase frequently during the 1988 campaign and promised to "never apologize for the United States" months prior to the July 1988 shoot-down and as early as January 1988.

The incident overshadowed Iran–United States relations for many years. The former CIA analyst Kenneth M. Pollack wrote: "The shoot-down of Iran Air Flight 655 was an accident, but that is not how it was seen in Tehran." Following the explosion of Pan Am Flight 103 five months later, the United States government initially blamed the PFLP-GC, a Palestinian militant group backed by Syria, with assumptions of assistance from Iran in retaliation for Flight 655. The distrust generated between the U.S. and Iran as a result of the downing of Iran Air Flight 655 was a challenge in the development of the Joint Comprehensive Plan of Action (JCPOA), also known as the Iran Nuclear Deal, which was agreed to on 14 July 2015.

Post-tour of duty medals

Despite the mistakes made in the downing of the plane, the crew of USS Vincennes were awarded Combat Action Ribbons for completion of their tours in a combat zone. The air warfare coordinator on duty received the Navy Commendation Medal, but The Washington Post reported in 1990 that the awards were for his entire tour from 1984 to 1988 and for his actions relating to the surface engagement with Iranian gunboats. In 1990, Rogers was awarded the Legion of Merit "for exceptionally meritorious conduct in the performance of outstanding service as commanding officer [...] from April 1987 to May 1989". The award was given for his service as the commanding officer of Vincennes from April 1987 to May 1989. The citation made no mention of the downing of Iran Air 655.

Maps

In popular culture

The events of Flight 655 were featured in "Mistaken Identity", a season 3 (2005) episode of the Canadian TV series Mayday (called Air Emergency and Air Disasters in the U.S., and Air Crash Investigation in the UK).

See also
 List of accidents and incidents involving commercial aircraft
 List of airliner shootdown incidents
 Ukraine International Airlines Flight 752, commercial aircraft shot down by Islamic Revolutionary Guard Corps (Iran) in 2020
Libyan Arab Airlines Flight 114
Malaysia Airlines Flight 17
Korean Air Lines Flight 007
Korean Air Lines Flight 902

Notes

References

Additional resources

 "Nunn Wants to Reopen Inquiry into Vincennes' Gulf Location". Washington Times, 4July 1992. Abstract: Senator Sam Nunn called on the Pentagon to probe allegations that the Navy "deliberately misled Congress" about the location of USS Vincennes when it shot down an Iranian civilian airliner four years ago.

 Fisk, Robert. The Great War for Civilisation—The Conquest of the Middle East. London: Fourth Estate, 2005. 318–328. 
 Marian Nash Leich, "Denial of Liability: Ex Gratia Compensation on a Humanitarian Basis" American Journal of International Law Vol. 83 p. 319 (1989)
 USS Vincennes Incident; Dan Craig, Dan Morales, Mike Oliver; M.I.T. Aeronautics & Astronautics, Spring 2004
 "Assumed Hostile" An academic case study by Pho H. Huynh, Summer 2003

Further reading

 International Court of Justice, (2001), "Case Concerning the Aerial Incident of July 3, 1988: v. 1: Islamic Republic of Iran v. United States of America", United Nations, 
 
 Rogers, Sharon, (1992) Storm Center: The USS Vincennes and Iran Air Flight 655: A Personal Account of Tragedy and Terrorism, U.S. Naval Institute Press,

External links

July 1988 events in Asia
Flight
20th-century aircraft shootdown incidents
Accidents and incidents involving the Airbus A300
Airliner shootdown incidents
Aviation accidents and incidents in Iran
Aviation accidents and incidents in 1988
Flight
History of Hormozgan Province
United States Navy in the 20th century
655
Iran–Iraq War
Iran–United States relations
Strait of Hormuz
Reagan administration controversies